Buccinaria is a genus of sea snails, marine gastropod mollusks in the family Raphitomidae.

Species
Species within the genus Buccinaria include:
 † Buccinaria guacoldae Nielsen, 2003 
 † Buccinaria hoheneggeri Kittl, 1887
 Buccinaria jonkeri (Koperberg, 1931)
 Buccinaria loochooensis MacNeil, 1961
 Buccinaria martini (Koperberg, 1931)
 Buccinaria nodosa Morassi & Bonfitto, 2010
 † Buccinaria okinawa MacNeil, 1960  
 Buccinaria pendula Bouchet & Sysoev, 1997
 Buccinaria pygmaea Bouchet & Sysoev, 1997
 Buccinaria urania (Smith E. A., 1906)
There are also many extinct species from Tertiary strata in Europe and Eastern Asia.
Species brought into synonymy
 Buccinaria abbreviata (Schepman, 1913): synonym of Acanthodaphne abbreviata (Schepman, 1913)
 Buccinaria javanensis van Regteren Altena, 1950: synonym of Buccinaria urania (E. A. Smith, 1906)
 Buccinaria koperbergi Martin, 1933: synonym of Buccinaria jonkeri (Koperberg, 1931)
 Buccinaria retifera Martin, 1933: synonym of Buccinaria jonkeri (Koperberg, 1931)
 Buccinaria teramachii (Kuroda, 1952): synonym of Buccinaria jonkeri (Koperberg, 1931)

References

 Bouchet P. & Sysoev A. (1997) Revision of the Recent species of Buccinaria (Gastropoda: Conoidea), a genus of deep-water turrids of Tethyan origin. Venus, Japanese Journal of Malacology, 56:93-119
 Morassi & Bonfitto, New raphitomine gastropods (Gastropoda: Conidae: Raphitominae) from the South-West Pacific

External links
  Bouchet, P.; Kantor, Y. I.; Sysoev, A.; Puillandre, N. (2011). A new operational classification of the Conoidea (Gastropoda). Journal of Molluscan Studies. 77(3): 273-308
 
 Worldwide Mollusc Species Data Base: Raphitomidae

 
Raphitomidae
Gastropod genera